2016 Regional League Division 2 Southern Region is the 8th season of the League competition since its establishment in 2009. It is in the third tier of the Thai football league system.

Changes from Last Season

Team Changes

Relegated Clubs
Phuket were relegated from the 2015 Thai Division 1 League.

Renamed Clubs

 Surat renamed Surat Thani.
 Satun United renamed Cadenza Satun United.

Relocated Club
Chumphon moved into the Western Region.

Returning Clubs

Hat Yai is returning to the league after a 1-year Withdrawn.

Teams

Stadium and locations

League table

Results

Season statistics

Top scorers
As of 3 September 2016.

See also
 2016 Thai Premier League
 2016 Thai Division 1 League
 2016 Regional League Division 2
 2016 Thai FA Cup
 2016 Thai League Cup
 2016 Kor Royal Cup

References

External links
 Division 2

Regional League South Division seasons